Erythroxylum obtusifolium is a species of plant in the Erythroxylaceae family. It is endemic to Sri Lanka.

References

obtusifolium
Endemic flora of Sri Lanka
Vulnerable plants
Taxonomy articles created by Polbot
Taxa named by Joseph Dalton Hooker